The Family Tree is a 1983 American television series that aired on NBC, and starred Anne Archer and Frank Converse. Its pilot episode was the 1982 television film The Six of Us. The show was canceled after six episodes due to low ratings.

Plot
Annie Benjamin (Anne Archer) a divorced woman with three children, who worked part-time selling real estate, meets and then marries Kevin Nichols (Frank Converse); a divorced owner of a lumber company with grown children of his own. Annie's children, who all lived with their mother, include oldest son, Sam (Martin Hewitt); Tess (Melora Hardin); and Toby (Jonathan Hall Kovacs) who is deaf.  On Kevin's side of the family, he has, besides his teenaged son Jake (James Spader), a grown daughter, Molly Tanner (Ann Dusenberry), who herself was already married. Jake lives with his mother, Elizabeth (Joanna Cassidy); and Annie's children are still very close to their father, Dr. David Benjamin (Alan Feinstein). Much of the stories focus on the problems of the Benjamin children adjusting to Kevin being their stepfather. Of all three of Annie's children, it was Toby, the youngest, who was perhaps most upset about his mother's divorce from his father.

Cast
 Anne Archer as Annie Benjamin Nichols
 Frank Converse as Kevin Nichols
 Jonathan Hall Kovacs as Toby Benjamin 
 Melora Hardin as Tess Benjamin 
 Martin Hewitt as Sam Benjamin
 James Spader as Jake Nichols
 Evan Ross as Josh Krebs

Ratings
<onlyinclude>

Episode Guide

References

External links

The Family Tree at TV-Guide.com

Family Tree, The
Family Tree, The
Family Tree, The
Family Tree, The
Family Tree, The
Television shows set in Minnesota